Álvaro Mas Huertas (born 22 May 1992) is a Spanish footballer who plays for CFUD Ilicitana as a midfielder.

Club career
Born in Elche, Valencian Community, Mas made his senior debuts with lowly FC Jove Español San Vicente. In the summer of 2013 he moved straight into Segunda División with neighbouring Hércules CF, immediately earning the trust of manager Quique Hernández and appearing during the preseason.

Mas made his debut in the competition on 17 August 2013, coming on as a late substitute for Javier Portillo in a 1–1 home draw against Real Zaragoza. On 22 August of the following year he was loaned to Tercera División's Orihuela CF.

References

External links
 
 Futbolme profile  
 

1992 births
Living people
Footballers from Elche
Spanish footballers
Association football midfielders
Segunda División players
Tercera División players
Hércules CF B players
Hércules CF players
Orihuela CF players